Sugar River may refer to:

Streams
 Sugar River (Michigan), a tributary of the Tittabawassee River
 Sugar River (New Hampshire), a tributary of the Connecticut River
 Sugar River (New York), a river in New York
 Sugar River (Wisconsin), a tributary of the Pecatonica River in Wisconsin and Illinois

Other
 Sugar River State Trail, in Wisconsin

See also
 Sugar Creek (disambiguation)
 Little Sugar River (disambiguation)
 Sugar (disambiguation)